Mycroft and Sherlock: The Empty Birdcage is a mystery novel by Kareem Abdul-Jabbar and Anna Waterhouse. It is the third novel in their "Mycroft Holmes" series utilizing Sir Arthur Conan Doyle's characters of Mycroft and Sherlock Holmes.

Reception

Publishers Weekly reviewed the novel positively saying "The authors do a stellar job of illuminating the siblings’ developing relationship while concocting a clever and twisty plot. Sherlockians will be enthralled." Library Journal called the third outing of Abdul-Jabbar and Waterhouse's Mycroft "another winner." San Francisco Book Review also praised the book and the characterization saying "This Mycroft is not only far more intriguing than previous versions, but one you can’t help but root for." Another positive review by author Lyndsay Faye said the authors "are marvelous at humanizing the legendarily prickly Holmes brothers" and hoped the book would be merely the third in "a great many more homages to the brothers Holmes."

References

External links
Mycroft and Sherlock: The Empty Birdcage at Titan Books
Kareem Abdul-Jabbar's website

2019 American novels
American detective novels
American mystery novels
Sherlock Holmes novels
Sherlock Holmes pastiches
Titan Books titles